Clarence Paul Oliver (November 8, 1898 – July 10, 1991), known to his friends as "Pete",  was an American geneticist. Born in Dexter, Missouri, he attended college at University of Texas receiving a BA in 1925. He continued his studies at University of Texas completing a PhD in the laboratory of Hermann Joseph Muller in 1931. From 1932 to 1946 he was a member of the faculty of University of Minnesota where future nobelist Edward B. Lewis worked in his lab as an undergraduate.  From 1946 to his retirement in 1971, he was a faculty member at University of Texas, where he studied human genetics and pseudoallelism.

Professional accomplishments
 Founding member of the American Society of Human Genetics (1948)
 President of the American Society of Human Genetics (1953)
 Secretary of the Genetics Society of America (1953- 1955)
 President of the Genetics Society of America (1958)
 Editor of the journal Genetics (1957-1963)
 Ashbel Smith Professor at the University of Texas

Sources
University of Texas Scholarship Page
In Memoriam Clarence Paul Oliver, memorial resolution of the University of Texas Austin Faculty Council

1898 births
1991 deaths
American geneticists
Muller, Hermann Joseph
People from Dexter, Missouri
Genetics (journal) editors